Yugoslav Army was a men's basketball selection based in Belgrade, Yugoslavia. It was the basketball section of the Sports Association of the Central House of the Yugoslav Army. The Yugoslav Army later founded KK Partizan and most of the players moved to the new club.

1945 season 
Team won the first Yugoslav Basketball League in 1945 against state selections of the Yugoslav states.

Roster

Matches

Trophies
Yugoslav League: (1)
1945

Aftermath 
The Yugoslav Army established Partizan on 4 October 1945. Marjanović, Kovačević, Munćan, Nikolić, Alagić, Kostić and Vlahović played for Partizan during the 1946 season.

References

Basketball teams in Yugoslavia
Basketball teams in Belgrade
Yugoslav People's Army
KK Partizan
1944 establishments in Yugoslavia
1946 disestablishments in Yugoslavia
Basketball teams established in 1944
Sports clubs disestablished in 1946